This article lists important figures and events in the public affairs of British Malaya during the year 1925, together with births and deaths of prominent Malayans.

Incumbent political figures

Central level 
 Governor of Federated Malay States and Unfederated Malay States :
 Laurence Nunns Guillemard
 Governor of Straits Settlements :
 Laurence Nunns Guillemard

State level 
  Perlis :
 Raja of Perlis : Syed Alwi Syed Saffi Jamalullail
  Johore :
 Sultan of Johor : Sultan Ibrahim Al-Masyhur
  Kedah :
 Sultan of Kedah : Sultan Abdul Hamid Halim Shah
  Kelantan :
 Sultan of Kelantan : Sultan Ismail
  Terengganu :
 Sultan of Terengganu : Sultan Sulaiman Badrul Alam Shah
  Selangor :
 British Residents of Selangor : Oswald Francis Gerard Stonor
 Sultan of Selangor : Sultan Alaeddin Sulaiman 
  Penang :
 Residents-Councillor : William Peel
  Malacca :
 Residents-Councillor : Ralph Scott 
  Negri Sembilan :
 British Residents of Negri Sembilan :
 Edward Shaw Hose (until unknown date)
 Ernest Charteris Holford Wolff (from unknown date)
 Yang di-Pertuan Besar of Negeri Sembilan :  Tuanku Muhammad Shah ibni Almarhum Tuanku Antah
   Pahang :
 British Residents of Pahang : Henry Wagstaffe Thomson
 Sultan of Pahang : Sultan Abu Bakar
  Perak :
 British Residents of Perak :
 Cecil William Chase Parr (until 20 December)
 Oswald Francis Gerard Stonor (from 20 December)
 Sultan of Perak : Sultan Abdul Aziz Al-Mutasim Billah Shah Ibni Almarhum Raja Muda Musa I

Events 
29 June – The Rubber Research Institute of Malaysia is founded.
 July – The British government agrees to suppress the Kuomintang in Malaya.
 Unknown date – Toh Allang Chinese Tin Ltd. is the first all-Chinese limited liability company established in Perak.

Births
1 January – Ahmad Koroh, fifth governor of Sabah (died 1978)
18 February – Ghafar Baba, former 6th Deputy Prime Minister of Malaysia (died 2006)
10 July – Mahathir Mohamad, former 4th and 7th Prime Minister of Malaysia
8 August – Aziz Sattar, actor and comedian (died 2014)

Deaths

See also
 1925
 1924 in Malaya
 1926 in Malaya
 History of Malaysia

References

1920s in British Malaya
Malaya